Delta is a 1969 Australian TV series, produced and broadcast by  ABC-TV in  1969-70. The title is the name of the fictional independent research organisation featured in the series, a freelance scientific consultancy which is called in to provide scientific investigators and troubleshooters in a wide range of situations, including pollution, forgery, mining, conservation, and the recovery of a lost satellite.

The series focusses on the exploits of one of Delta's mobile laboratories, and initially featured three lead regular characters, investigative scientist Jeff Mallow (John Gregg), his assistant Inger Petri (Kirrily Nolan) and science specialist Brian Fitch (Kevin Miles). A fourth regular character, scientist Jackie Stuart (Patsy Trench) was added for the second season.

The series was one of the first major in-house productions from the ABC's recently established Drama Unit. It was devised by Colin Free and overseen by ABC Head of Drama David Goddard, who also acted as  producer for the series. It broke new ground in Australian TV drama as the first local series to cover topical issues like pollution and conservation from a scientific and investigative viewpoint. The relatively high budget and the wide-ranging premise of the series allowed for extensive use of locations, and the entire series was shot entirely on film - also unusual for the period, since most Australian series at the time were either videotaped in the studio or had an integrated production that combined videotaped interiors and filmed exteriors.

References

External links

Delta at Classic Australian TV
Episode Guide at Classic Australian TV

Australian Broadcasting Corporation original programming
Australian adventure television series
1969 Australian television series debuts